The members of the 19th Knesset were elected on 22 January 2013, and sworn in on 5 February.

Members of the Knesset

Replacements

See also
Thirty-third government of Israel

References

External links
Current Knesset Members of the Nineteenth Knesset Knesset website

 
19